Normafa is a popular tourist sight in the Buda Hills. It is mainly known for its panoramic scenery and fresh air.

The name 
The name is derived from the name of a tree, the "Norma tree". Allegedly the beech tree was planted by King Matthias Corvinus in the 15th century. The name reflects an on-location performance by opera singer Rozália Klein Schodel and performers of the Hungarian National Theater in a rendition of the Cavatina from Vincenzo Bellini's Norma.  The tree itself fell on the morning of June 19, 1927. The tree is commemorated in a poem by Gábor Devecseri.

Geography 
The height of the mountain is 477 m. It connects Svábhegy and János Hill with a long but narrow plateau (Normafa fennsík). The whole block is based on Dachstein formation.

Gallery

References

External links 
 
 
 

Geography of Budapest
Buda Hills